The Ritz-Carlton, Riyadh (Arabic: فندق الريتز كارلتون بالرياض) is a luxury hotel in Riyadh, Saudi Arabia.

History

Prominent guests
Between 21–22 May 2017, President Donald Trump was a guest at the hotel as it hosted events for the 2017 Riyadh summit. Former President Barack Obama was a guest in 2014. In October 2017, the hotel hosted the Future Investment Initiative with over 3,500 invitees.

Use as a prison

Since 4 November 2017 the hotel had been closed to business and become a detention center for those detained as part of the 2017 Saudi Arabian anti-corruption arrests. Guests staying at the hotel were notified that, “Due to unforeseen booking by local authorities which requires an elevated level of security, we are unable to accommodate guests until normal operations are restored.” Guests were ejected and no further bookings were accepted. A notice on the hotel's website read, "Due to unforeseen circumstances, the hotel’s internet and telephone lines are currently disconnected until further notice."

Re-opening to regular guests
According to CNN the hotel re-opened for regular guests in February 2018.

See also

References

Riyadh
Hotels established in 2011
Hotels in Saudi Arabia